Mind over Matter is the debut studio album by Zion I. It was released by Ground Control Records in 2000. It was nominated for Independent Album of the Year by The Source in 2000.

Critical reception

Jon Azpiri of AllMusic gave the album 3 out of 5 stars, writing, "Influenced equally by hip-hop and various forms of electronica, Zion I offers listeners a collage of new sounds mixed with ancient spiritualism." Del F. Cowie of Exclaim! called it "a truly invigorating affair."

In 2015, HipHopDX included it on the "30 Best Underground Hip Hop Albums Since 2000" list.

Track listing

References

External links
 

2000 debut albums
Zion I albums